Thomas Alleyn may refer to:

Thomas Alleyn (MP), in 1393 MP for East Grinstead (UK Parliament constituency)
Thomas Alleyn (3rd Master of Dulwich College) (died 1668/1669)
Thomas Alleyn (Barber-Surgeon) (died 1631)

See also
Alleyn
Thomas Allen (disambiguation)
Thomas Alleyne (died 1558), English priest